Menlo F. Smith (born January 9, 1927) is a prominent St. Louis businessman. He has also been a leader in the Church of Jesus Christ of Latter-day Saints (LDS Church) both in St. Louis and in the Philippines. He is also a benefactor of Brigham Young University and the founder of Enterprise Mentors International now known as Mentors, International.

Smith was born in St. David, Arizona, where his father was the school superintendent. Shortly after this the family moved to Texas where his father pursued a degree in agricultural economics from Texas A&M University. Later they lived for a time with his grandparents in Colorado, and then moved to Salt Lake City where his father, J. Fish Smith, was the co-owner of a company producing a fruit drink mix called Frutola. Later they changed the product name to Lick-Me-Aide and marketed it as candy. Smith began working for this company in 1936. Smith graduated from the University of Utah. There he met Mary Jean Jacobson who he married. They became the parents of five children. She died in 2011.

After graduating college Smith moved to St. Louis. There in 1952 he founded the Sunmark Corporation. They transformed Like-Me-Aide into Pixy Stix. Shortly afterward he used equipment at the Tums factory where his neighbor worked to reprocess his candy as SweeTarts. Over the years Smith's company grew. While he served in the Philippines from 1982–1985 he had his team run the company for him. After he returned he began to think he wanted to go into venture capitalism. In 1986 he sold the company to a British firm, Rowntree Mackintosh Confectionery.

Smith was a great-grandson of Jesse N. Smith. However his parents were not active in the Church of Jesus Christ of Latter-day Saints and Smith was not a member. In the 1960s, the social unrest caused him to feel there was a need for more stability. He was baptized a member of the Church of Jesus Christ of Latter-day Saints in 1972.

During the 1980s, Smith served as president of the LDS Church's Philippines Baguio Mission. There he saw many people living in poverty and suffering from having to borrow money at rates at times as high as 300%. After ending his service as mission president he reached out to discuss the issue in a meeting he had with Dallin H. Oaks. Oaks got him in touch with the BYU business school, and later Smith and Warner Woodworth decided to work together to address this issue. Smith and Woodworth then formed Enterprise Mentors International as a development and micro-credit organization. Besides helping people in the Philippines, it also has helped people start small businesses in numerous Latin American countries as well as in Africa.

From 1997 to 2000 Smith was the first president of the LDS Church's St. Louis Missouri Temple. He has also been a Regional Representative of the Twelve and a bishop in the LDS Church.

Smith served as a member of the board of directors of the Mercatus Center of George Mason University.

Smith is also a donor to BYU and recognized as one of the founders of the Center for Entrepreneurship of the Marriott School of Management.

References

 Center for Entrepreneurship founders listing
 Church News, November 15, 2008; April 19, 1997
 Marriott School of Management National Advisory board listing
 2018 KSL article on Smith

External links
 Menlo's bio at the Mercatus Center

1927 births
American leaders of the Church of Jesus Christ of Latter-day Saints
American Mormon missionaries in the Philippines
American businesspeople
Brigham Young University people
Living people
Mission presidents (LDS Church)
Regional representatives of the Twelve
Temple presidents and matrons (LDS Church)
University of Utah alumni
20th-century Mormon missionaries
People from Cochise County, Arizona
Latter Day Saints from Arizona
Latter Day Saints from Missouri
Converts to Mormonism